The acronym ISSB may refer to the following organizations: 
 Inter-Services Selection Board, a committee of the Pakistan Armed Forces
 International Sustainability Standards Board, a standard-setting body under the IFRS Foundation